Ramsey Lewis and his Gentle-men of Jazz is the second album by American jazz pianist Ramsey Lewis featuring tracks recorded in 1956 and released on the Argo label.

Reception

Allmusic awarded the album 4 stars calling it an "enjoyable trio set".

Track listing
 "Delilah" (Victor Young) - 5:25   
 "I Get a Kick Out of You" (Cole Porter) - 3:00   
 "Please Send Me Someone to Love" (Percy Mayfield) - 4:02   
 "Brother John" (Traditional) - 4:50   
 "Black Is the Color of My True Love's Hair" (Traditional) - 4:51   
 "It Ain't Necessarily So" (George Gershwin, Ira Gershwin) - 2:44   
 "Seven Valleys" (Fred Katz) - 5:25   
 "On the Street Where You Live" (Alan Jay Lerner, Frederick Loewe) - 3:40

Personnel 
Ramsey Lewis - piano
El Dee Young - bass
Redd Holt - drums

References 

1957 albums
Ramsey Lewis albums
Argo Records albums